The Gay Caballero may refer to:

 "The Gay Caballero", a 1928 song Frank Crumit
 "The Gay Caballero", one of the songs in "The Grand Uproar" from Fleischer Studios
The Gay Caballero (1932 film), American western directed by Alfred L. Werker
The Gay Caballero (1940 film), American western directed by Otto Brower
 "The Gay Caballero", a 1959 episode of American TV series Zorro

See also
The Gay Cavalier (disambiguation)